A longa (pl. longae, or sometimes longe), long, quadruple note (Am.), or quadruple whole note is a musical note that could be either twice or three times as long as a breve (Am.: double whole note, or double note), four or six times as long as a semibreve (Am.: whole note), that appears in early music. The number of breves in a long was determined by the "modus" or "mode" of a passage. Sections in perfect mode used three breves to the long while sections in imperfect mode used two breves to the long. Imperfect longs, worth two breves, existed in perfect mode from the earliest sources (late 12th century), while the fourteenth century saw the introduction of perfect longs, worth three breves, in imperfect mode through the use of dots of addition (puncti additiones).

Prior to the innovations of Franco of Cologne in the mid-thirteenth century, the value of the longa was in common usage in both theoretical and practical sources but appeared primarily in pre-mensural notation ligatures, symbols representing two or more notes joined together. A ligature that began with a longa was said to lack "propriety", while ligatures ending with a longa possessed "perfection", since in the view of that era a "proper and perfect" rhythmic sequence was the succession of a brevis followed by a longa, justified by the fact that the ligature representing this rhythm is written the same way as a plainchant ligature (a different usage of the term from above). As a result, there were four possible ligature types: those beginning with a brevis and ending with a longa, which had both propriety and perfection; the reverse, which had neither; those both beginning and ending with a longa, which lacked propriety but had perfection; and those beginning and ending with a brevis, which were proper but not perfect. Two longae, rarely three, had the combined value of a maxima. The theoretical value of a maximodus perfectus could only be written with three longae or a maxima plus a longa.

Prior to 1450, the longa was typically written with a filled notehead with void (unfilled) and red noteheads used only to indicate an imperfect longa where perfect longae would otherwise be expected. Over the course of the fifteenth century, the void notehead (shown in the image above) became the norm. Unlike other rests used in [mensural notation] which, like the notes, took the same form whether perfect or imperfect, longa rests often had different forms when the rest was imperfect—filling two spaces—or perfect—filling three spaces. Although it is described as late as 1667, by this date the note symbol was of purely theoretical interest, since changes in notational practice had rendered it too extended a value for practical use.. While the longa note has not been used for more than three centuries, the longa rest still appears as a way of writing rests that last exactly four measures.

When the longa note occurs in modern notation (since it is supported by some scorewriters), it is often given the rounded notehead shape of the double whole note, looking like . In this context it is sometimes called a quadruple whole note. In LilyPond, the longa stem appears similarly to that of a half note, instead of always appearing on the right of the notehead as it does in mensural notation: this can be seen below.

See also
 List of musical symbols

References

Further reading
 
 

Latin words and phrases
Note values